The Iberian 10,000 Metres Championships or Iberian Trophy is an annual team track running competition over 10,000 metres that is contested between athletes from Portugal and Spain. The event has been held over two separate periods. Launched in 1991, the competition originally ran for six editions, but was made defunct by the European 10000 Metres Challenge in 1997. That competition was expanded further as the European Cup 10,000m in 2005. A desire to resume a bi-national event saw the relaunch of the original event under the title of the "Iberian Trophy" in 2011.

The competition consists of two elements: an individual aspect and a team aspect. The team competition is decided by combining the finishing times of each nations four best performing athletes. There are two senior races, one for each of the sexes. On top of this, the host nation incorporates its nation championship into the race, so the host's leading athlete is also declared the national champion. Guest athletes are a common feature and, although their times and finishing positions are recorded, they are not considered part of the international Iberian Trophy race.

Editions

Champions

 The 1991 individual women's race was won by guest athlete Delilah Asiago of Kenya.
 The 2011 individual races were won by Kenya guest athletes Vincent Rono and Vivian Cheruiyot.
 The 2013 individual women's race was won by guest athlete Trihas Gebre Aunoon of Ethiopia. She later became a Spanish citizen.

References

Athletics competitions in Portugal
Athletics competitions in Spain
10K runs
Recurring sporting events established in 1991
Athletics team events